is a passenger railway station located in the city of Tamba-Sasayama, Hyōgo Prefecture, Japan, operated by West Japan Railway Company (JR West).

Lines

Station layout
The station consists of two opposed ground-level side platforms connected to the station building by a footbridge. The station is unattended.

Platforms

Adjacent stations

History
Furuichi Station opened on 25 March 1899. With the privatization of the Japan National Railways (JNR) on 1 April 1987, the station came under the aegis of the West Japan Railway Company.

Station numbering was introduced in March 2018 with Furuichi being assigned station number JR-G67.

Passenger statistics
In fiscal 2016, the station was used by an average of 197 passengers daily

Surrounding area
 Sasayama Municipal Furuichi Elementary School
 Mount Shirakami and Mount Matsuo.

See also
List of railway stations in Japan

References

External links

 Station Official Site

Railway stations in Hyōgo Prefecture
Railway stations in Japan opened in 1899
Tamba-Sasayama